Naraj Marthapur railway station is a railway station on the East Coast Railway network in the state of Odisha, India. It serves Naraj Marthapur village. Its code is NQR. It has three platforms. Passenger, MEMU, Express and Superfast trains halt at Naraj Marthapur railway station.

Major trains

 Puri–Ajmer Express
 Bhubaneswar–Bolangir Intercity Superfast Express
 Hirakud Express
 Sambalpur–Puri Intercity Express
 Rourkela–Bhubaneswar Intercity Express

See also
 Cuttack district

References

Railway stations in Cuttack district
Khurda Road railway division